Abid Sher Ali 
(born 21 November 1971) is a Pakistani politician  who served as Minister of State for Power, in the Abbasi cabinet from August 2017 to May 2018. Previously, he served as the Minister of State for Water and Power from 2013 to 2017. He had been a member of the National Assembly of Pakistan, from 2002 to May 2018.

Personal life
He was born on 21 November 1971. He is the son of former mayor of Faisalabad and senior PML-N leader Chaudhry Sher Ali who is a relative of Kalsoom Nawaz Sharif. Ali is nephew of Nawaz Sharif. He went to Divisional Public School for his early studies.

Political career
Ali was elected to the National Assembly of Pakistan as a candidate of Pakistan Muslim League (N) (PML-N) from Constituency NA-84 (Faisalabad-X) in 2002 Pakistani general election.

He was re-elected to the National Assembly as a candidate of PML-N from Constituency NA-84 (Faisalabad-X) in 2008 Pakistani general election.

Ali was re-elected to the National Assembly as a candidate of PML-N from Constituency NA-84 (Faisalabad-X) in 2013 Pakistani general election.

In July 2013, Ali was appointed as the Minister of State for Water and Power. He had ceased to hold ministerial office in July 2017 when the federal cabinet was disbanded following the resignation of Prime Minister Nawaz Sharif after Panama Papers case decision. Following the election of Shahid Khaqan Abbasi as Prime Minister of Pakistan in August 2017, he was inducted into the federal cabinet of Abbasi. He was appointed as the Minister of State for Power, a division under then-newly created Ministry of Energy. Upon the dissolution of the National Assembly on the expiration of its term on 31 May 2018, Ali ceased to hold the office as Minister of State for Power.

He ran for the seat of the National Assembly from Constituency NA-108 (Faisalabad-VIII) as a candidate of PML(N) in the 2018 Pakistani general election but was unsuccessful. He received 111,529 votes and lost the seat to Farrukh Habib, a candidate of Pakistan Tehreek-e-Insaf (PTI).

He ran for the seat of the National Assembly from Constituency NA-108 (Faisalabad-VIII) as a candidate of PML(N) in the 2022 Pakistan by-elections but was unsuccessful. He received 75,421 votes and lost the seat to Imran Khan, the chairman of PTI.

References

Living people
Pakistani MNAs 2013–2018
Pakistan Muslim League (N) politicians
People from Faisalabad
Politicians from Punjab, Pakistan
Punjabi people
1971 births
Pakistani MNAs 2002–2007
Pakistani MNAs 2008–2013